Altıeylül is a new intracity district and second level municipality in Balıkesir Province, Turkey. According to Law act no 6360, all Turkish provinces with a population more than 750000, were declared metropolitan municipality. The law also created new  districts within the capital city  which have second level municipalities in addition the metropolitan municipality. . Altıeylül is one of them.

Thus after 2014 the present Balıkesir central district was split into two . A part  was named Altıeylül and the name Balıkesir was reserved for the metropolitan municipality.
(Altıeylül or 6 September was the date of recovery of Balıkesir during the Turkish War of Independence in 1922.)

Rural area
There were one town and 80 villages in Altıeylül rural area. Now their official status became "neighborhood of Altıeylül".As of 2013 the population of Altıeylül was Karesi was 170,260.

Neighbourhoods

 Akarsu 
 Akçakaya 
 Akçaköy
 Aliağa
 Aslıhan
 Aslıhantepeciği 
 Ataköy
 Atköy
 Aynaoğlu
 Ayvacık
 Ayvatlar
 Ayşebacı
 Bahçedere
 Balıklı 
 Bayat
 Bağalan
 Bereketli
 Beşpınar
 Bigatepe
 Bozen
 Büyük Bostancı
 Cinge
 Dallımandıra
 Dedeburnu
 Dereköy
 Dereçiftlik 
 Dişbudak
 Ertuğrul
 Gökköy 
 Gökçeören
 Halalca
 Kabaklı
 Karabeyler
 Karakavak
 Karakaya 
 Karamanköy
 Karamanlar
 Kirazköy
 Kirazpınar
 Konakpınar
 Kozderegüvem
 Kozören
 Kutludüğün
 Kuyualan
 Kuşkaya
 Köseler
 Köylüköy
 Küpeler
 Kürse
 Küçükbostancı 
 Kılcılar
 Macarlar
 Meryemdere
 Orhanlı
 Ortamandıra
 Ovabayındır
 Ovaköy
 Pamukçu
 Paşaköy
 Sarıalan
 Selimiye
 Sıvatpınar
 Tayyipler
 Taşköy 
 Taşpınar
 Turnalar
 Türkali
 Yakupköy
 Yenice
 Yeşiller
 Yeşilyurt
 Çakıllık
 Çamköy
 Çandır
 Çayırhisar
 Çiftlik
 Çiftçidere
 Çiçekpınar
 Çukur Hüseyin
 Çınarlıdere
 İnkaya

References

Districts of Balıkesir Province